"The Troublemakers" was an American television play broadcast on November 21, 1957, as part of the second season of the CBS television series Playhouse 90. John Frankenheimer directed. Ben Gazzara, Barbara Rush, and Keenan Wynn starred.

Plot
A group of university students beat and kill an outspoken journalist for the school newspaper. One of the students struggles with his conscience over his vow to remain silent about the event.

Cast
The following performers received screen credit for their performances:

 Ben Gazzara - Stanley Carr
 Barbara Rush - Clara Gerrity
 Keenan Wynn - Mr. Sprock
 Mary Astor - Mattie Gerrity
 Jackie Coogan - Sgt. Bender
 Harry Guardino - Ralph Como
 Nick Adams - Sandy Remington
 Robert Vaughn - Steve Sprock
 Jack Mullaney - Torin Gerrity
 Malcolm Atterbury - Otis Gerrity

Production
John Frankenheimer was the director and Martin Manulis the producer. George Bellak wrote the teleplay. It was originally broadcast on November 21, 1957. It was part of the second season of Playhouse 90, an anthology television series that was voted "the greatest television series of all time" in a 1970 poll of television editors.

References

1957 television plays
1957 American television episodes
Playhouse 90 (season 2) episodes